Ali Sebbar is a Moroccan chess International Master.

Chess career
Sebbar won the 2013 Moroccan Chess Championship, has represented his country in a number of chess olympiads, including 2004 and 2014, and played in the Chess World Cup 2013, being defeated by Sergey Karjakin in the first round.

References

External links 

Ali Sebbar chess games at 365Chess.com

Living people
Moroccan chess players
1981 births